State Route 101 (SR 101) is state highway in Bledsoe and Cumberland counties in the eastern portion U.S. state of Tennessee.

Route description

SR 101 begins in the rolling farmlands of Bledsoe County at a Y-Intersection with SR 30 in the Mount Crest community. It then goes northwest as it enters a large wooded area before coming to an intersection with SR 285, where it turns northeast and crosses into Cumberland County. It then becomes curvy as it passes through the rolling hills and farmland of the Cumberland Plateau before passing just north of Lake Tansi Village and having an intersection with SR 282, northeast of Meadow Park Lake. It then has an intersection with SR 419, which provides access to Cumberland Mountain State Park. It then enters Crossville, at an intersection with SR 392 (a beltway around downtown). It then enters downtown and comes to an intersection and becomes concurrent with US 70/SR 1. They then intersect US 127/SR 28 a short distance later. They then leave downtown and come to another intersection with SR 392, where SR 101 separates from US 70/SR 1 and goes north to have an interchange with I-40 (Exit 322) before leaving Crossville and continuing northeast. It then enters the Fairfield Glade Resort, where it ends and continues as Peavine Road.

Junction list

References

101
Transportation in Bledsoe County, Tennessee
Transportation in Cumberland County, Tennessee